Gun Papaq-e Olya (also Romanized as Gūn Pāpāq-e ‘Olyā; also known as Gūn Pāpāq and Gūnpāpāq-e Bālā) is a village in Arshaq-e Gharbi Rural District, Moradlu District, Meshgin Shahr County, Ardabil Province, Iran. At the 2006 census, its population was 208, in 38 families.

References 

Towns and villages in Meshgin Shahr County